Blue Hole is a blue hole dive site off the western coast of Guam. It is variously described as "Guam’s signature natural feature dive," "the most requested dive site on Guam," and "one of Guam’s most popular divesites". It is located in northern Agat Bay, just south of the entrance to Apra Harbor. Despite being very close to the southern coast of the Orote Peninsula, sheer cliffs mean that it is done exclusively as a boat dive, typically out of Cabras Marina in Apra Harbor, located 20 minutes away. The opening of the sinkhole appears to be a heart shape to divers within it. While entry to the site is done while the dive boat is hooked into a mooring buoy, exit typically requires deploying a surface marker buoy in east-to-west current and pickup in the open ocean.

It is common to see large pelagic fish or sharks along the wall. The reef flat at 60 feet has several coral patches and schooling fish.

See also 
 Underwater diving on Guam

References

External links 
 

Agat Bay
Tourism in Guam
Landmarks in Guam
Sports in Guam
Underwater diving sites in Guam